Biophilia Records is an American record label founded in 2011 by musician Fabian Almazan in Harlem, New York. The music label takes an environmentally-conscious approach in its packaging and distribution.

Among the artists on Biophilia Records are bassist Linda May Han Oh; percussionist, composer, and vocalist Rajna Swaminathan, María Grand, Justin Brown, as well as Almazan himself.

History
Havana, Cuba-born Almazan grew up in Miami, Florida, and became a jazz pianist and studied at the Manhattan School of Music. The Grammy-nominated pianist and composer, performed his own music, while also working with Terence Blanchard. In addition, he performed on film scores for Spike Lee and George Lucas.

Drawing inspiration from biologist Edward O. Wilson's book Biophilia, which is a study in the interaction of humans and the environment, he formed Biophilia Records in 2011 based on that philosophy. Almazan opened the Biophilia Records office in Harlem, first releasing his own, Personalities, then others including Endless Field's eponymous album, Linda May Han Oh's Walk Against the Wind, and 19 more albums over the years.

Philosophy
Biophilia Records releases all its music on double-sided, 20-panel origami-like packages that include the artwork and liner notes for the album's artist. The package does not contain a CD, instead includes on one of its 20 panels, a code for purchasers to download the music online. Almazan trademarked the packaging as Biopholio™ to offer the music industry an environmentally friendly option.

"There’s this current movement towards vinyl," said Almazan. "But I couldn’t in good conscience start a label and make vinyl and CDs knowing there are already hundreds of thousands of tons of plastic in the ocean, not to mention on land."

Biophilia works with its artists to volunteer with local environmental and sustainability causes, and invites fans to volunteer alongside them at events such as marshland cleanups, tree plantings and free community performances for public school children. Label artists gave a solar-powered Earth Day concert in New York's Union Square on March 18, 2017, in partnership with BioBus, a mobile laboratory that brings science to the city's children.

Artists
 Fabian Almazan
 Linda May Han Oh
 Lara Bello
 Desmond White
 Charlie Christenson
 Rajna Swaminathan
 Adam O’Farrill
 María Grand
 Justin Brown
 Endless Field (Jesse Lewis and Ike Sturm)
 The Awakening Orchestra & Kyle Saulnier
 Stranger Days
 Bryan and the Aardvarks
 Charlie Christenson
 Lara Bello

Discography

References

External links
 Facebook
 Twitter
 YouTube

American record labels
Jazz record labels
World music record labels
Rock record labels
Hip hop record labels